In public finance, a currency board is a monetary authority which is required to maintain a fixed exchange rate with a foreign currency. This policy objective requires the conventional objectives of a central bank to be subordinated to the exchange rate target. In colonial administration, currency boards were popular because of the advantages of printing appropriate denominations for local conditions, and it also benefited the colony with the seigniorage revenue. However, after World War II many independent countries preferred to have central banks and independent currencies.

Although a currency board is a common (and simple) way of maintaining a fixed exchange rate, it is not the only way. Countries often keep exchange rates within a narrow band by regulating balance of payments through various capital controls, or though international agreements, among other methods. Thus, a rough peg may be maintained without a currency board.

Features of "orthodox" currency boards 

The main qualities of an orthodox currency board are:

  A currency board's foreign currency reserves must be sufficient to ensure that all holders of its notes and coins (and all bank creditors of a Reserve Account at the currency board) can convert them into the reserve currency (usually 110–115% of the monetary base M0).
 A currency board maintains absolute, unlimited convertibility between its notes and coins and the currency against which they are pegged (the anchor currency), at a fixed rate of exchange, with no restrictions on current-account or capital-account transactions.
 A currency board only earns profit from interest on foreign reserves (less the expense of note-issuing), and does not engage in forward-exchange transactions. These foreign reserves exist (1) because local notes have been issued in exchange, or (2) because commercial banks must, by regulation, deposit a minimum reserve at the Currency Board. (1) generates a seignorage revenue. (2) is the revenue on minimum reserves (revenue of investment activities less cost of minimum reserves remuneration)
 A currency board has no discretionary powers to affect monetary policy and does not lend to the government. Governments cannot print money, and can only tax or borrow to meet their spending commitments.
 A currency board does not act as a lender of last resort to commercial banks, and does not regulate reserve requirements.
 A currency board does not attempt to manipulate interest rates by establishing a discount rate like a central bank. The peg with the foreign currency tends to keep interest rates and inflation very closely aligned to those in the country against whose currency the peg is fixed.

Consequences of adopting a fixed exchange rate as prime target 
The currency board in question will no longer issue fiat money but instead will only issue one unit of local currency for each unit (or decided amount) of foreign currency it has in its vault (often a hard currency such as the U.S. dollar or the euro). The surplus on the balance of payments of that country is reflected by higher deposits local banks hold at the central bank as well as (initially) higher deposits of the (net) exporting firms at their local banks. The growth of the domestic money supply can now be coupled to the additional deposits of the banks at the central bank that equals additional hard foreign exchange reserves in the hands of the central bank.

Pros and cons 
The virtue of this system is that questions of currency stability no longer apply. The drawbacks are that the country no longer has the ability to set monetary policy according to other domestic considerations, and that the fixed exchange rate will, to a large extent, also fix a country's terms of trade, irrespective of economic differences between it and its trading partners. Typically, currency boards have advantages for small, open economies which would find independent monetary policy difficult to sustain. They can also form a credible commitment to low inflation.

Examples in recent history 
More than 70 countries have had currency boards. Currency boards were most widespread in the early and mid 20th century.

Hong Kong operates a currency board (Hong Kong Monetary Authority), as does Bulgaria. Estonia had a currency board fixed to the Deutsche Mark from 1992 to 1999, when it switched to fixing to the Euro at par. The peg to the Euro was upheld until January 2011 with Estonia's adoption of the Euro (see Economy of Estonia for a detailed description of the Estonian currency board). Argentina abandoned its currency board in January 2002 after a severe recession. To some, this emphasised the fact that currency boards are not irrevocable, and hence may be abandoned in the face of speculation by foreign exchange traders. However, Argentina's system was not an orthodox currency board, as it did not strictly follow currency board rules – a fact which many see as the true cause of its collapse. They argue that Argentina's monetary system was an inconsistent mixture of currency board and central banking elements.  It is also thought that the misunderstanding of the workings of the system by economists and policymakers contributed to the Argentine government's decision to devalue the peso in January 2002. The economy fell deeper into depression before a recovery began later in the year.

The British Overseas Territories of Gibraltar, the Falkland Islands and St. Helena continue to operate currency boards, backing their locally printed currency notes with sterling reserves.

A gold standard is a special case of a currency board where the value of the national currency is linked to the value of gold instead of a foreign currency.

Examples against the euro 
 Bulgarian lev
 Bosnia and Herzegovina convertible mark (Konvertibilna marka)

Examples against the U.S. dollar 
 Hong Kong dollar
 Bermudian dollar
 Cayman Islands dollar
 Djiboutian franc
 East Caribbean dollar (Antigua and Barbuda, Dominica, Grenada, Saint Kitts and Nevis, Saint Lucia, and Saint Vincent and the Grenadines)
 For complete listing, see United States dollar

Examples against the pound sterling 
 Falkland Islands pound
 Gibraltar pound
 Saint Helena pound

Examples against other currencies 
 Brunei dollar, against the Singapore dollar
 Macanese pataca, against the Hong Kong dollar
 The Faroe Islands have a de jure currency board, but in fact the Danish National Bank serves as the lender of last resort and all bank accounts are denominated in Danish kroner. The Danish National Bank refers to the Faroese króna as a "special version" of the Danish krone. Danish kroner itself is partly back by Euro foreign reserve of Danish National Bank

Historical examples
 Argentine peso, pegged against the United States dollar from 1991 until 2002.
 Bahraini dinar, fixed against the pound sterling from 1966 until 1973.
 Bahamian pound, fixed against the pound sterling from 1921 until 1966
 Bahamian dollar was fixed against the United States dollar from 1966 until 1968.
 Bosnia and Herzegovina convertible mark, fixed against the Deutsche Mark from 1998 until 2002. Fixed to the Euro thereafter. 
 British West African pound, fixed against the pound sterling from 1913 until 1964.
 Ceylonese Rupee, fixed against the Indian silver rupee from 1884 until 1950.  
 Irish pound, pegged against pound sterling from independence until 1979, issued by a currency board until 1942.
East African shilling, fixed against the pound sterling from 1921 until 1969.
 Estonian kroon, fixed against the Deutsche Mark from independence in 1992 until 1999. Fixed to the Euro thereafter until 2011.
 Lithuanian litas, fixed against the US dollar from  1994 until 2002. Fixed to the euro thereafter until 2015 when the litas was replaced with the euro.

See also 
Central bank
Dollarization
Monetary policy
Argentine Currency Board
Linked exchange rate system in Hong Kong

References

Further reading
 Tiwari, Rajnish (2003): Post-Crisis Exchange Rate Regimes in Southeast Asia: An Empirical Survey of De-Facto Policies, Seminar Paper, University of Hamburg. ( PDF)
 "On Currency Boards: An Updated Bibliography of Scholarly Writings." 
 Steve  H. Hanke and Kurt Schuler, Currency Boards for Developing Countries: A Handbook (1994, revised edition 2015). 
For a precise definition of what constitutes a currency board, including past examples, see:
 Hanke, Steve H. (2002): "On Dollarization and Currency Boards: Error and Deception," Journal of Policy Reform, Vol. 5, no. 4, pp. 203–222.  (PDF)
 Nikolay Nenovsky's works on Currency boards issues: (nikolaynenovsky.com )
 Arnaldo Mauri, The Currency Board and the rise of banking in British East Africa, W.P. n. 10-2007, Department of Economics, University of Milan. Abstract in English.

External links 
Currency boards and dollarization (archived Web site)
 Johns Hopkins Institute for Applied Economics, Global Health, and the Study of Business Enterprise, Currency Board Book Series, Studies in Applied Economics working paper series (includes many papers on currency boards),, and Digital Archive on Currency Boards.

Board
Monetary policy
Government institutions